The Nieuport 24 (or Nieuport XXIV C.1 in contemporary sources) was a World War I French sesquiplane fighter aircraft designed by Gustave Delage as a development of the successful Nieuport 17.

The Nieuport 24 had the misfortune to be the penultimate design suited to tactics that were being superseded when it entered service. Its small size, relatively light weight and small engine gave it a significant manoeuvrability advantage in a dog fight. However, larger and heavier fighters that relied almost entirely on speed such as the SPAD VII and Albatros D.III were entering service along with the introduction of ever larger combat formations, which generally negated its manoeuvrability.
While its handling was improved slightly, its performance was little better than the previous Nieuport 23 it was meant to replace, and so it was operated alongside larger numbers of the SPAD S.VII, although in November 1917, out of a French frontline fighter strength of 754 aircraft, Nieuports still made up 310 aircraft. Operational Nieuport 24s served with French, British and Russian units, and the type also served widely as an advanced trainer.

Design and development

The Nieuport 24 utilized a new wing of the same planform as the preceding Nieuport 23, but with a plywood leading edge and a new airfoil section having a flatter underside. The forward spar was moved aft, visibly affecting the cabane struts, which were then angled back. The ailerons had their tips rounded off and to reduce drag and were given a fabric strip reinforced with wire to cover the hinge gap, however the strip severely affected the type's handling, so it was removed shortly after service entry. 

The same fuselage with minor detail changes was used as on the Nieuport 17bis, which featured an improved aerodynamic form compared to the earlier Nieuports, with longitudinal stringers running from just aft of the moulded plywood cockpit sides to the tail. Internally the structure was updated, and while the 17bis had its Vickers gun offset to port, the 24 had it mounted to the starboard of the centerline.

The 24 also received an entirely new rounded moulded plywood empennage incorporating a small fixed fin and a half-heart shaped rudder. Use of the new tail was delayed, and most production aircraft were of the Nieuport 24bis model, which reverted to the Nieuport 17 type tailplane and rectangular balanced rudder but was otherwise the same as the 24. The Nieuport 27 would use the new tail, along with a new split-axle undercarriage and internally sprung tailskid. The 24 retained the faired wood externally sprung tailskid used on previous types. A  Le Rhône rotary engine was fitted in a spun aluminium cowl similar to those used on the late models of the Nieuport 17 and 23.

The standard armament of the Nieuport 17 of a synchronised  Vickers, and optionally an overwing  Lewis gun in French or Italian service or a Lewis on a Foster mounting on the top wing in British service, was retained. Many 24 and 24bis airframes were used as advanced fighter-trainers and flown unarmed.

Service history

In the summer of 1917, when the Nieuport 24 and 24bis began coming off the production line, many French fighter squadrons were replacing their Nieuport 17s with SPAD S.VIIs but some French units retained Nieuports into 1918 when they were effectively obsolete, although the type was preferred by some, especially the famous Charles Nungesser. The type's most notable accomplishment occurred when Nieuports of N152 were responsible for downing two Zeppelins, L49 and L50 during the night of 19–20 October 1917.

France's allies operated them, including the Russians and the British. The Russians would continue to operate their Nieuports throughout the Russian Civil War, and even received 20 French-built Nieuport 24s after the Czar's abdication. Production of additional examples was undertaken by Dux, who had licence-built previous Nieuports. Production was undertaken both before and after the Soviet victory. The Soviets would rename Dux to GAZ No 1 (Государственный авиационный завод № 1 or State Aviation Plant No. 1) and production continued until at least 1923. Examples remained in service until at least 1925.

In the summer of 1917, the RFC still regarded deliveries of Nieuport scouts as a top priority although the 24 and 24bis were regarded as interim types pending Nieuport 27 deliveries. Royal Aircraft Factory S.E.5 deliveries began shortly afterward, but a low production rate forced the British to use their Nieuport scouts operationally well into 1918.

The Japanese bought several pattern aircraft and from 1921 to 1923 built 102, with work started by the Army Supply Depot at Tokorozawa until taken over by Nakajima. These were later designated as the Ko 3, however the Japanese did not distinguish between the 24 and the 27, initially calling both the Ni 24. Most of their Nieuport 24s were fitted with the  Le Rhône 9C. The Japanese operated them until the 1926, much longer than they did their SPAD S.XIIIs, which were retired in 1922.

The Americans bought large numbers of Nieuport advanced trainers for their flying schools in France in November 1917, which either included 227 Nieuport 24s and 16 Nieuport 24bis or 121 Nieuport 24s and 140 Nieuport 24bis, depending on which source you believe, illustrating the difficulty in dealing with surviving source documents which often didn't distinguish between the 24, 24bis and the 27.
 
The Soviet's donated a Nieuport 24 and other types in 1921 to Afghanistan's King Amanullah Khan. It still existed in 1924 when the Afghan Military Air Arm was formed.

Variants

Nieuport 24 C.1 single seat fighter
Nieuport 24 E.1 unarmed single seat fighter-trainer, often fitted with an  Le Rhône 9C
Nieuport 24bis C.1 similar to 24 but used earlier metal tail with a comma shaped rudder and an angular horizontal tail.
Nieuport 24bis E.1 unarmed single seat fighter-trainer, often fitted with an  Le Rhône 9C
Nieuport 25 C.1 Similar to 24 or 27, but with larger  Clerget rotary. Very few produced.
Nieuport 26 C.1 Development of 24, powered by Hispano-Suiza V-8 engine.
Nieuport 27 C.1 development of 24 with pivoted tailskid and new undercarriage.
Nakajima 甲 3 (Ko 3) Japanese designation for locally-built Nieuport 24/27.
Nieuport B.Kh2 Siamese designation for Nieuport 24bis.

Operators

Afghan Military Air Arm
 

Brazilian Air Force – operated 6 examples

 
Bulgarian Air Force – One 24bis captured in 1917 was operated

Service Aéronautique
Army Cooperation 
Escadrille N.12
Escadrille N.23
Escadrille N.38
Escadrille N.49
Escadrille N.62
Escadrille N.68
Escadrille N.69
Escadrille N.75
Escadrille N.76
Escadrille N.77
Escadrille N.79
Escadrille N.82
Escadrille N.85
Escadrille N.87
Escadrille N.88
Escadrille N.89
Escadrille N.90
Escadrille N.91
Escadrille N.92
Escadrille N.93
Escadrille N.94
Escadrille N.95
Escadrille N.96
Escadrille N.97
Escadrille N.98
Escadrille N.99
Escadrille N.102
Escadrille N.124
Escadrille N.150
Escadrille N.151
Escadrille N.152
Escadrille N.155
Escadrille N.156
Escadrille N.157
Escadrille N.158
Escadrille N.159
Escadrille N.160
Escadrille N.161
Escadrille N.162
Escadrille N.312
Escadrille N.313
Escadrille N.314
Escadrille N.315
Escadrille N.392
Escadrille N.523
Escadrille N.561
Escadrille N.562
Escadrille N.581
Group de Combat 11
Escadrille N.12
Escadrille N.31
Escadrille N.48
Escadrille N.57
Escadrille N.94
Group de Combat 12
Escadrille N.3
Escadrille N.26
Escadrille N.73
Escadrille N.103
Group de Combat 13
Escadrille N.15
Escadrille N.65
Escadrille N.84
Escadrille N.124
Group de Combat 14
Escadrille N.75\
Escadrille N.80
Escadrille N.83
Escadrille N.86
Group de Combat 15
Escadrille N.78
Escadrille N.92
Escadrille N.93
Escadrille N.112
Provisional Groupe de Bonneuil
Escadrille N.82
Escadrille N.153
Escadrille N.154
Escadrille C46

Estonian Air Force – operated several examples postwar.

Hellenic Air Force – operated around 20 Nieuport 24bis postwar.

Latvian Air Force – operated as many as 11 ex-Russian examples, postwar.

Imperial Japanese Army Air Force – built by Nakajima

Polish Air Force – operated 1 ex-Russian Nieuport 24 and 5 Nieuport 24bis.

Romanian Air Corps – operated several Nieuport 24s.

Imperial Russian Air Service – operated 20 Nieuport 24s, plus additional examples built in Russia by Dux.

Serbian Air Force

 Siam
Royal Siamese Air Service

Turkish Air Force

Royal Flying Corps/Royal Air Force
No. 1 Squadron RFC
No. 29 Squadron RFC
No. 40 Squadron RFC
No. 111 Squadron RFC
No. 113 Squadron RFC

Workers' and Peasants' Red Air Fleet – operated ex-Imperial Russian Air Service aircraft.

American Expeditionary Force
United States Army Air Service – operated a variety of Nieuport 24s and Nieuport 24bis as trainers.

Specifications (Nieuport 24 C.1)

See also

Notes

References

 

Cheesman E.F. (ed.) Fighter Aircraft of the 1914–1918 War Letchworth, Harletford Publications, 1960 pp. 96–97

Janić Č, Petrović O, Short History of Aviation in Serbia, Beograd, Aerokomunikacije, 2011. 

Taylor, John W. R., and Jean Alexander. "Combat Aircraft of the World" New York: G.P. Putnam's Sons, 1969 Pg.115 LOC Catalog Number 68-25459
     

024
1910s French military trainer aircraft
1910s French fighter aircraft
Military aircraft of World War I
Aircraft first flown in 1917
Single-engined tractor aircraft
Rotary-engined aircraft
Sesquiplanes